Uruguay competed at the Deaflympics for the first time in 2001, when they sent a delegation consisting of only one athlete in the event. The second time in the deaflympics was in 2022 games in Caxias do Sul, Brazil, with three athletes. Uruguay yet to receive a medal at the Deaflympics.

Medal tallies

Summer Deaflympics

Medal tallies by sport

See also 
 Uruguay at the Olympics
 Uruguay at the Paralympics

References 

Nations at the Deaflympics
D
Deaf culture in Uruguay